Frederick Woolnough Paterson (13 June 1897 – 7 October 1977) was an Australian politician, activist, unionist and lawyer. He is the only representative of the Communist Party of Australia to be elected to an Australian parliament.

Early history
Paterson was born and raised on a pig farm in Gladstone, Queensland. He was educated at Brisbane Grammar School and then studied classics at the University of Queensland, before joining the military when the First World War broke out. He subsequently saw action on the battlefields of France. While in France, he was involved in two food-related strikes, which were both successful.

In January 1920, Paterson moved to Merton College, Oxford to study theology, after becoming a Rhodes Scholar. However, by the time he sat for his honours degree in 1922, his belief in Christianity had changed. He had witnessed extreme poverty in Ireland and parts of London, and this concerned him. Not long after returning to Queensland, Paterson joined the Communist Party of Australia.

Paterson began studying law in 1923. By 1924, he was giving lectures on Marxism. Then, in 1925, he began working for the Workers' Educational Association. This saw him addressing unions, giving lectures on the history of the working-class, and trying to increase the association's membership.

Politics and the Communist Party
In 1931, Paterson was admitted to the New South Wales Bar. He based himself in Brisbane, but later that year went to Townsville to defend two Italian workers, who had been charged with assaulting the Italian consul.

As the Great Depression set in, Paterson became involved in fighting racist employment policies in the sugar industry. At the time, the unions and employer associations had a policy of refusing employment to Italian workers to combat unemployment in the industry. Paterson led a campaign by both the Communist Party and the Italian community and was successful in ending the practice. In 1933, Paterson left Brisbane completely, and set up in Townsville. He spent his time juggling both a part-time legal career and his burgeoning role as a travelling activist for the Communist Party. By this time, he had gained a reputation as a fine public speaker.

In April 1934, Paterson was nominated by the Communist Party as their candidate for mayor of Brisbane but he was easily defeated by Alfred James Jones, the Labor candidate.

During the late 1930s, the Communist Party continued to grow rapidly in North Queensland, with Paterson at the forefront. He played a significant role in the union movement in the sugar industry during a key strike over workplace conditions, and became involved in the anti-fascist movement.

In 1939, Paterson stood successfully as an alderman for the Townsville City Council, becoming the first member of the Communist Party to win such an office in Australia. He was then re-elected in 1943. The same year, he stood for the federal seat of Herbert, but was defeated.

Member for Bowen (1944 - 1950)
The next year, he again made history, when at his third attempt, he won the State electoral seat of Bowen at the 1944 Queensland state election. While Paterson had polled slightly behind his rival in Bowen itself, he was far in front in the mining and sugar-farming areas, which resulted in a significant victory. He retained the seat at the following election.

During his time in parliament, Paterson advocated for a "socialist post-war reconstruction" aimed at achieving full employment. These policies included increasing nurse salaries, the implementation of the 40 hour work week into law, equal pay for women, capping rents in relation to the average income, and abolishing child labor on farms. Paterson also advocated for free publicly owned and managed housing, child care, nurseries, playgrounds, pharmaceuticals and hospitals, and the introduction of free education from kindergarten to "the highest level at university". These public institutions would have been established through wide-spread nationalisation. He also advocated for the nationalisation of most key industries in Australia.

Demonstrations
After being elected to Parliament, Paterson largely gave up the law, to concentrate on his political career. He continued being actively involved in public issues, particularly through the union movement, and was a vocal critic of the government of the time. He often made speeches at the Domain in central Brisbane. Paterson was rewarded, retaining his seat at the 1947 state election. During the 1948 railway strike, he regularly joined the picket line in the mornings before going to sit in Parliament. He also gave the picketers legal advice. Paterson knew that the police had the power to order the picketers to move, but that they did not have the power to order them where exactly to move. He then devised a strategy where, as they were moved on by the police, the picketers simply moved around the block.

During a demonstration in Brisbane, on 17 March 1948,  Paterson intervened when a police officer began to assault a demonstrator near Central station. Paterson was himself then struck from behind by another officer, and was rushed to hospital in an ambulance, unconscious. Paterson was unable to do any political activity for some months afterwards. An inquiry into the incident found that no wrongdoing had occurred and no police officer was ever arrested or charged with the assault. The ex-Queensland police officer and former Labor leader Bill Hayden later named the officer as sergeant Jack Mahony, who had boasted about using a pick handle on "the 'Commie' Fred Paterson" during Hayden's time as an officer.

While Paterson was recovering, the Queensland branch of the veterans organisation Returned and Services League of Australia (RSL) expelled him for being a Communist. However, his return to Townsville, once he had sufficiently recovered from his injuries to travel, was widely celebrated.

End of political career
In a 1949 redistribution, Paterson's electorate of Bowen was abolished, and split between two new electorates: Burdekin and Whitsunday. Historian Ross Fitzgerald suggests that the redistribution was done deliberately to split Paterson's electoral support and prevent him from being returned to parliament in the 1950 election. Paterson contested the election in Whitsunday, but lost to Country Party candidate Lloyd Roberts.

Paterson's defeat at the 1950 election largely ended his political career. At the time, Prime Minister Robert Menzies was launching his anti-Communist campaign, and introducing legislation to prevent Communists from holding public office.  Paterson was involved in the successful campaign against Menzies' anti-Communist measures together with Max Julius, and he continued to be involved in the union movement and Communist Party right up until his death in 1977.

Paterson and fellow communist Gilbert Burns were constantly the subject of surveillance by the federal security service more correctly known as the Commonwealth Security Service (CSS). The Brisbane office of the CSS was run by Bob Wake.

See also
 Members of the Queensland Legislative Assembly, 1944–1947
 Members of the Queensland Legislative Assembly, 1947–1950

References

External links

1897 births
1977 deaths
Australian Rhodes Scholars
University of Queensland alumni
Alumni of Merton College, Oxford
Members of the Queensland Legislative Assembly
People from Townsville
Australian socialists
Australian communists
Australian Marxists
Communist Party of Australia members